Thoraciliacus rostriceps is an extinct species of frog from the Cretaceous period and the only species of the genus Thoraciliacus, which is classified in the unranked clade Pipimorpha. Fossils of T. rostriceps were found in Makhtesh Ramon, Negev Desert, Israel and it is believed they lived during the Barremian. Other fossils have been found near Marydale, South Africa in an Upper Cretaceous lake.

Description
Thoraciliacus rostriceps was a small frog,  in length, with a large head. It had short hind limbs but its hands and feet were relatively large. Like its close relative Nevobatrachus gracilis, T. rostriceps was highly aquatic evidenced by its flat skull, short axial column and long metapodials.

See also
 List of prehistoric amphibians

References

Pipoidea
Prehistoric amphibian genera
Early Cretaceous frogs
Early Cretaceous amphibians of Asia
Late Cretaceous amphibians of Africa
Fossil taxa described in 1968